The World Economic Journal is a monthly business magazine published in Russian and English. The international English edition covers world economic data, dynamics, and analytics directly from Russia.

History
The magazine was established by the British not-for-profit partnership World Organization of Creditors in 2009 and is regularly published in Russia since then. It is published and distributed in the United States and Canada since 2011. Since 2013, three additional editions are available: French, German and Spanish.

Distribution
In the United States, the magazine is sold through Hudson News. In Russia, it is distributed by subscription and presented at international economic forums, conferences, and relevant organizations and structures, such as the State Duma, the Federation Council of the Russian Federation, the Chamber of Commerce and Industry of the Russian Federation, the Ministry of Economic Development of the Russian Federation, the Association of Russian banks and others.

References

External links
 

Multilingual magazines
Magazines established in 2009
Monthly magazines published in Russia
Business magazines published in Russia